Sathi ("a companion") may refer to:

Sathi (1938 film), Indian Bengali-language film released in 1938
Sathi (1972 film), Indian Malayalam-language film released in 1972
Sathi (2002 film), Indian Bengali-language film released in 2002

See also
 Saathi (disambiguation)
 Sathe, a town in Ethiopia
 Sathe (surname)